Epicausis is a genus of moths of the family Noctuidae from Madagascar.

Species
Epicausis smithii (Mabille, 1880)
Epicausis vaovao 	Viette, 1973

References

Natural History Museum Lepidoptera genus database

Cuculliinae